Tito Fritiof Colliander (10 February 1904 – 21 May 1989) was a Finnish Eastern Orthodox Christian writer.

Biography
Colliander was born in St. Petersburg, the son of Colonel Sigfried Joakim Colliander and his wife Dagmar Ilmatar, née von Schoultz. Colliander received an artistic education. His wife, Ina Behrsen, was also an artist, and his son Sergius became an Orthodox priest.

Beginning in the 1930s, Colliander published a number of novels and short stories that made him famous. His books were written under the strong influence of Dostoyevsky's frequent themes of guilt and searching for faith in the modern world. His novels Crusade (Korståget), Mercy (Förbarma dig) and others were translated into foreign languages. Colliander was one of the contributors of Garm, a Swedish language satirical magazine based in Helsinki.

Colliander and his wife Ina converted to Orthodoxy, and the writer attended the Orthodox seminary from 1949 to 1953. His most famous book, The Way of the Ascetics (Asketernas väg), was first published in Swedish. The English translation, The Way of the Ascetics, went through several editions. He also wrote a memoir of life in Tsarist Russia and Finland in a pre-war book about Ilya Repin.

He died on 21 May 1989 and is buried at the Orthodox cemetery in Helsinki near Lapinlahti.

References

External links
Tito Colliander
 

1904 births
1989 deaths
Eastern Orthodox Christians from Russia
Eastern Orthodox theologians
Eastern Orthodox writers
Finnish writers in Swedish
Members of the Orthodox Church of Finland
Writers from Helsinki
Pro Finlandia Medals of the Order of the Lion of Finland